Nicoletiidae is a family of primitive insects belonging to the order Zygentoma. These insects live primarily underground, under detritus, or in caves. A few species are recorded as commensals inside nests of social insects, such as the species Allotrichotriura saevissima which lives inside fire ant nests.Nicoletiidae don’t have eyes as other existing species and they lack pigment. They have medium size, with extended antennae and terminal filaments.Coletinia, a genus of this family,  has many characters including a body length that ranges between 10 and 15mm. They may have yellowish pigmentation but most of them are transparent. They have bilayered and very large acrosome, a short nucleus including chromatin being really condensed with tubular invaginations and sperm length and head size classified as short.

Selected genera
 Allotrichotriura
 Anelpistina 
 Atelura
 Battigrassiella
 Coletinia 
 Hemitrinemura Oceania, fossils known from Dominican amber (Miocene) 
 Lepidospora 
 Nicoletia 
 Prosthecina
 Squamatinia 
 Squamigera 
 Texoreddellia
 Trinemurodes fossils known from Dominican amber (Miocene)

Extinct genera
†Archeatelura Mendes 1997 Dominican amber, Miocene
†Paleograssiella Mendes and Poinar 2013 Mexican amber, Miocene

References

Fauna Europaea

Zygentoma
Insect families
Extant Miocene first appearances